Franklin Howard White,  (born 1945 in Abbotsford, British Columbia) is a Canadian writer, editor and publisher.

In the early 1970s, he founded the Raincoast Chronicles and Harbour Publishing. In 2013 he and his wife Mary purchased the assets of the leading British Columbia book publisher Douglas & McIntyre and restructured it as Douglas & McIntyre (2013) Ltd. with White as publisher. He has been president of the Association of Book Publishers of British Columbia, a member of the Board of Governors of Emily Carr University of Art and Design, and currently sits on the Advisory Board of the Canadian Centre for Studies in Publishing at Simon Fraser University and the Advisory Board of the Institute for Coastal Research at Vancouver Island University.

Published works
 Raincoast Chronicles (1972, editor)
 A Hard Man to Beat (1983, with Bill White)
 The Men There Were Then (1983, poems)
 Spilsbury's Coast (1987, with Jim Spilsbury)
 The Accidental Airline (1988, with Jim Spilsbury)
 Patrick and the Backhoe (children's), with Bus Griffiths
 Writing in the Rain (1990, collection)
 Ghost in the Gears (1993, poems)
 The Sunshine Coast (1996, travel)
 The Encyclopedia of British Columbia (2000, publisher, contributor), a 10-year project.
 The Airplane Ride (2006, children's)
 A Mysterious Humming Noise (2019, poems)
 Here on the Coast (2021, stories)

Awards
 Canadian Historical Association's Career Award for Regional History in 1989.
 Order of BC
 Stephen Leacock Medal for Humour
 James Douglas BC Publisher of the Year Award
 Queen Elizabeth II Golden Jubilee Medal
 Queen Elizabeth II Diamond Jubilee Medal
 Honorary Doctor of Laws Degree from the University of Victoria.
 Two-time runner-up in the Whiskey Slough Putty Man Triathlon
 S.S. Beaver Award for Maritime Excellence
 Order of Canada

References 
 Harbour Publishing Bio

1945 births
Living people
Members of the Order of Canada
People from Abbotsford, British Columbia
Stephen Leacock Award winners
Writers from British Columbia